The House of Representatives (Majlis al-Nuwaab) is the lower house of the Parliament of Yemen. It shares the legislative power with the Shura Council, the upper house. The Assembly of Representatives has 301 members, elected for a six-year term in single-seat constituencies. It is one of the rare parliamentary chambers in the world to currently have no female representation.

The House of Representatives was established in 1990 after the unification of Yemen for a transitional period. An election hasn't been held for the body since 2003. An election was set for 27 April 2009, but president Saleh postponed it by two years on 24 February 2009. However, the election did not take place on 27 April 2011, and was again postponed until the next presidential election, sometime in February 2014.
In January 2014, the final session of the National Dialogue Conference (NDC) announced that both elections had been delayed, and would occur within 9 months of a referendum on a new constitution which had yet to be drafted. However both the GPC and Houthi representatives on the National Authority for Monitoring the Implementation of NDC Outcomes have refused to vote on the new constitution drafted by the constitution drafting committee, which submitted it in January 2015.

In February 2015, the Houthis briefly dissolved parliament before reportedly agreeing to reinstate the 301-member assembly in UN-brokered talks. Under the agreement, it will be augmented by a "people's transitional council" serving as the upper house.

Since the civil war, the House of Representatives had held semi-regular sessions in San'aa in Houthi-held territory. In 13 April 2019, the first session was held in Seiyun, in Hadi-controlled Hadhramaut Governorate.

Latest elections
The last parliamentary election in Yemen took place in 2003.

See also
 List of speakers of the House of Representatives of Yemen
 Politics of Yemen
 List of legislatures by country

References

Yemen
Politics of Yemen
Government of Yemen
1990 establishments in Yemen